Evangelical Church of Christ can refer to:

United States
A Mormon fundamentalist sect established in 1975 by John W. Bryant
On the National Register of Historic Places
 Evangelical Church of Christ (Portsmouth, Ohio)